James Edward Watkins (June 21, 1877 – March 29, 1933), was a Major League Baseball outfielder who played in  with the Philadelphia Phillies.

Watkins played in 1 game, going 0-3, with a walk.

He was born in Philadelphia, Pennsylvania and died in Kelvin, Arizona.

References

External links

1877 births
1933 deaths
Baseball players from Pennsylvania
Major League Baseball outfielders
Philadelphia Phillies players